Zenith is an unincorporated community in Crawford County, Georgia, United States.

History
A post office called Zenith was established in 1893, and remained in operation until 1934. The community was so named on account of its lofty elevation.

Notes

Unincorporated communities in Crawford County, Georgia
Unincorporated communities in Georgia (U.S. state)